Marc Ybarra (born December 18, 1998) is an American soccer player who currently plays as a midfielder for the Pittsburgh Riverhounds in the USL Championship.

Career

Youth
Ybarra attended Ann Arbor Skyline, but never played high school soccer for the Eagles, instead playing club soccer with Crew Soccer Academy Wolves between 2013 and 2017. Ybarra played in the Generation Adidas Cup with Columbus Crew, winning their division of U.S. Soccer Development Academy.

College & Amateur
In 2017, Ybarra attended the University of Michigan to play college soccer. During his time with the Wolverines, Ybarra made 91 appearances, scoring nine goals and tallying 24 assists. He holds the Michigan record for number of games played and games started, as well as total minutes on the pitch. Ybarra is also second in all-time Michigan assists. He earned numerous accolades, including; Big Ten Midfielder of the Year in 2021, Big Ten All-Tournament Team in 2021, Big Ten All-Freshman Team in 2017, and a Four-time Academic All-Big Ten winner.

During his time at college, Ybarra also played in the National Premier Soccer League with AFC Ann Arbor during their 2018 season, scoring two goals in nine appearances, helping them to win the Great Lakes Conference. In 2019, he played in the USL League Two with Flint City Bucks, making six appearances in the regular season and one playoff appearance as the Bucks went on to become the 2019 USL League Two season champions.

Professional
On February 24, 2022, Ybarra signed his first professional contract, joining USL Championship club Pittsburgh Riverhounds prior to their 2022 season. He made his professional debut on March 12, 2022, starting in a 3–0 win over Memphis 901.

Honors

Club
Flint City Bucks
USL League Two: 2019

References

External links
Marc Ybarra at University of Michigan Athletics
Marc Ybarra Pittsburgh Riverhounds Profile

1998 births
Living people
AFC Ann Arbor players
American soccer players
Association football midfielders
Flint City Bucks players
Michigan Wolverines men's soccer players
National Premier Soccer League players
People from Ann Arbor, Michigan
Pittsburgh Riverhounds SC players
Soccer players from Michigan
USL Championship players
USL League Two players